Jo Gwang-je (born 17 March 1980) is a South Korean breaststroke swimmer. He competed in two events at the 1996 Summer Olympics.

References

External links
 

1980 births
Living people
South Korean male breaststroke swimmers
Olympic swimmers of South Korea
Swimmers at the 1996 Summer Olympics
Place of birth missing (living people)